Our Elders Teach Us is a book by David Carey, professor of History at the University of Southern Maine.  It outlines a detailed history of the people of Latin America, particularly the Kaqchikel of Guatemala.

Oral histories are a key component of this discussion wherein they represent a compelling alternative of history composed primarily of the "victors."

Preservation of both human and natural resources, i.e. sustainability, is another critical point of Our Elders Teach Us.

External links
University of Southern Maine website

Books about Latin America